Bill Godfrey Oval is a sports venue in Burleigh Waters, Queensland, a suburb in the Gold Coast, Australia. It includes an Australian Rules Football and cricket ground. Bill Godfrey Oval was named after Mr Thomas Willam (Billy) Melbourne Godfrey. Bill Godfrey will be inducted into the Hall of Fame of the new Gold Coast Stadium, the home of the Gold Coast Suns.

In 2006 the Burleigh Cricket Club, nicknamed Bullsharks, was established and began playing home matches at Bill Godfrey Oval in the summer months.

See also

 Sports on the Gold Coast, Queensland
 Sport in Queensland

References

Rugby league stadiums in Australia
Soccer venues in Queensland
Rugby union stadiums in Australia
Netball venues in Queensland
Skateparks in Australia
Australian rules football grounds
Cricket grounds in Australia
Sports venues on the Gold Coast, Queensland